The Fire Services Bureau (CB) is responsible for fire and rescue services in Macau. Volunteer fire brigades in Macau dates back to 1851 and full-time department in 1883. Prior to 1851, the Portuguese military provided fire services in the colony. In 1999, the CB became a fully civilian agency. Today the department is organized under the Macau Security Force (since 1976 after decades as a division of public works, Leal Senado and municipal control). The brigade is responsible for fire and rescue for both land and air.

The CB operates an ambulance service (Ambulância de Macau), but the Macau Red Cross also operates ambulances (Toyota HiAce vans) for emergency and non-emergencies to local hospitals with volunteer staff.

The organization has a total of 739 uniformed firefighters and paramedics serving from seven fire stations in Macau with one central HQ on Macau.

Stations

Macau's fire brigade began with a single station in 1883 and had three by 1916:

 Station 1 – Central
 Station 2 – Avenida Almirante Sérgio
 Station 3 – Avenida Horta e Costa

, there are seven fire stations in Macau:

Mainland
 Lago Sai Van (Avenida Dr. Stanley Ho) – modern five-storey building housing fire and ambulance operations; located next to Sai Van Lake; completed 2006 and home to fire services headquarters
 Areia Preta (bounded by Dr. Francisco Vieira Machado Do and Marginal da Areia Preta, Estrada Nordeste, Avenida Do and Nova Da Areia Preta Rua) – second station on mainland and designed by architect Manuel Vicente (1992–1996)

Taipa
 Taipa (Rua Siu Kuan, Rua Nam Keng) – fire and ambulance depot; fire training tower on the north end of Taipa
 Airport Division – two stations at the airport with one main depot (along runway) and one sub-depot (next to north end of terminal)

Coloane
 (Estrada do Alto de Coloane and Estrada do Dique Oeste) – fire services depot
Cotai
 (Rua Campo) – fire operations station
 newest fire station being constructed 2009–2010

Central Command Centre and Museum is a two storey colonial building formerly Station 1 and fire headquarters.

Commissioners

 Loi Kam Wan – Commissioner Macau Fire Service
 Eurico Lopes Fazenda – Deputy Commissioner Macau Fire Service
 Lei Pun Chi – Deputy Commissioner Macau Fire Service

Rank
The following ranks are observed in the CB in accordance with Law No. 2/2008 (Restructure of the Careers in the Security Forces and Departments):

 Chief major
 Adjunct chief major
 Principal chief
 Adjunct chief
 First class chief
 Assistant chief
 Chief
 Deputy chief
 Chief firefighter
 First class firefighter
 Firefighter

Fleet

Land vehicles

 Honda Civic City Command Car 
 Mercedes-Benz Bronto Skylift F52 HLA snorkel 
 Scania Heavy Rescue Tender  
 Land Rover Defender rescue operation 
 Scania TTL aerial 
 Scania 114G HAZMAT tender 
 Mitsubishi Canter TLF 
 Mitsubishi STLF FUSO/Morita Snorkel 17M  
 Mazda Astina 1.8 Commander Car 
 Suzuki Commander Car   
 Mitsubishi Canter TLF  
 Mercedes-Benz 3535 
 Scania 94D Heavy Rescue Unit 
 Mercedes-Benz Sprinter Rescue Unit 
 Mercedes-Benz 412 Ambulance   
 Suzuki Van 
 Mercedes-Benz 210 Ambulance  – Ambulância de Macau
 Mitsubishi Fuso/Morita 40M TL 
 Iveco Magirus 260-32AH/DL 50 
 Mercedes-Benz 1622/Metz DLK30 
 Mitsubishi Fuso/Morita AP17 
 Mitsubishi/Morita TLF 2500 
 Mitsubishi/Morita TLF 1500 
 Mitsubishi Canter TLF 1500 
 Mitsubishi Canter GW 
 Land Rover TLF 
 Suzuki Commander Car 
 Mitsubishi Van 
 Mercedes-Benz 210 Ambulance  – Ambulância de Macau
 Rosenbauer Panther airport crash tender 
 Oshkosh T3000 airport crash tender

Boats
 Boston Whaler Challenger – 27' fire and rescue boat  – managed by Macau Marine Department
 SEN Engenharia e Arquitectura Naval, Multi-Purpose Rescue and Fire Boat  – for use at airport

Air Support
Sky Shuttle Helicopters can provides search and rescue support when victims need to be transported by area to hospital for treatment.

Ambulances are European standard Type B.

Uniform and gear
The uniform and insignia worn by CB personnel follows the model worn by the firefighters of Portugal.

The gear worn by the CB are similar to ones worn in Hong Kong:

 Pacific F3D fire helmet – fire crews
 F1 Gallet fire helmet – fire crews

Firefighters wear yellow helmets, while senior officers use blue.

 Nomex protection hood

Ambulance officers use chartreuse safety helmet with visor.

See also
 China Fire and Rescue
 Fire Services Department (Hong Kong)

Notes

References

External links
 Fire Services Bureau website /

Fire departments of China
Government departments and agencies of Macau
1851 establishments in the Portuguese Empire